Rafael Vágner Dias Silva or simply Vágner (born June 9, 1983 in Betim), is a Brazilian footballer. He currently plays for Guaratinguetá Futebol.

Honours
Paraná State League 2004
Rio de Janeiro's Cup: 2007

Contract
1 February 2007 to 31 December 2008

External links
canalbotafogo.com
CBF
globo.com

1983 births
Living people
Brazilian footballers
Clube Atlético Mineiro players
Coritiba Foot Ball Club players
Botafogo de Futebol e Regatas players
Clube Náutico Capibaribe players
Ipatinga Futebol Clube players
Paysandu Sport Club players
Guaratinguetá Futebol players
Association football defenders